Josef Johansson (born 10 June 1993) is a Tunisian-Swedish pop singer and songwriter.

Born in Tunisia where he began singing as a young singer at age 6, he was raised in Gothenburg, Sweden. He later moved to Stockholm and appeared in a number of recordings as a demo artist for American producers.

He was signed to Warner Music in 2012, releasing his debut single "Baby Baby" that was released in the spring of 2013. The single played on various Swedish  radio stations. In 2013 he was awarded the Ted Gärdestad scholarship for his songwriting.

In 2014, Johansson took part in Melodifestivalen 2014 in a bid to represent Sweden in Eurovision Song Contest 2014. He sang "Hela Natten" in the fourth round of the semi-finals during Melodifestivalen, but did not qualify to the finals. Despite that, his song charted on the Swedish Singles Chart, peaking at number 58.

Discography

References

External links
Official website

21st-century Swedish male singers
Swedish pop singers
21st-century Tunisian male singers
Tunisian emigrants to Sweden
1994 births
Living people
People from Gothenburg
Melodifestivalen contestants of 2014